Bernardo Freitas (born 18 February 1990, Cascais) is a Portuguese sailor. He competed at the 2012 Summer Olympics in the 49er class finishing in 8th.
In 2017-18, he was a crewmember on the boat Turn the Tide on Plastic in the Volvo Ocean Race.

References

External links 
 
 
 

1990 births
Living people
Portuguese male sailors (sport)
Olympic sailors of Portugal
Sailors at the 2012 Summer Olympics – 49er
Extreme Sailing Series sailors
Volvo Ocean Race sailors
Sportspeople from Cascais